Nyishi Baptist Church Council (NBCC) is a Baptist Christian denomination in the state of Arunachal Pradesh in North East India. It is affiliated to the Arunachal Baptist Church Council of the Council of Baptist Churches in Northeast India.
NBCC had 464 churches and 60,000 members in 2017.

Arunachal Theological College
Arunachal Theological College in Moinhappa, Itanagar is under the umbrella of Nyishi Baptist Church Council (S.B.C.A.), through which all the supports, needs and function of the College would be channelized. The Institute was inaugurated on 15 May 1997.

See also
 Council of Baptist Churches in Northeast India
 List of Christian denominations in North East India

External links
 Website of the Nyishi Baptist Church Council

References

Baptist denominations in India